The Sværholtklubben Nature Reserve is a protected area of land at the northern tip of the Sværholt Peninsula in Finnmark county, Norway. It comprises a rugged promontory with steep cliffs that provide nesting sites for some 40,000 seabirds. A 220 ha area encompassing the reserve and its adjacent marine waters has been designated an Important Bird Area (IBA) by BirdLife International.

References

 

Nordkapp
Lebesby
Porsanger
Nature reserves in Norway
Important Bird Areas of Norway
Important Bird Areas of the Arctic
Seabird colonies